Deafman Glance is the fourth studio album by American musician Ryley Walker. It was released in May 2018 under Dead Oceans Records.

Critical reception

The album received a Metacritic score of 76 based on 13 critics, indicating generally favorable reviews.

Accolades

Track listing

Personnel
Adapted from Discogs.
 Written-by, Producer, Vocals, Electric Guitar, Acoustic Guitar – Ryley Walker
 Producer, Arranged By [Horns], Keyboards, Lap Steel Guitar, Piano, Clarinet, Electric Guitar – Leroy Bach
 Bass – Matthew Lux (tracks: 3, 4, 7)
 Double Bass, Bass – Andrew Scott Young
 Drums – Quin Kirchner (tracks: 1, 5, 6, 9)
 Drums, Percussion, Bells – Mikel Avery
 Electric Guitar – Bill MacKay, Brian Sulpizio
 Flute, Saxophone – Nate Lepine (tracks: 1, 3, 5 to 7)
 Mastered by – Jeff Lipton
 Cover Painting – Tim Hallinan
 Photography – Evan Jenkins
 Design – Miles Johnson
 Recorded by, Mixed By, Synth, Organ – Cooper Crain

Charts

References

2016 albums
Dead Oceans albums
Ryley Walker albums